In the U.S. state of Massachusetts, the highway division of the Massachusetts Department of Transportation (MassDOT) assigns and marks a system of state-numbered routes.


List

Unnumbered state roads
These are state roads which, for the most part, do not carry a numbered designation.  They are generally short in length and serve important roles as main roads or connections between other main roads.

See also

External links
Highway Division of the Massachusetts Department of Transportation
 (Includes a road inventory and maps.)
Neilbert.com Massachusetts Route Log
The Roads of Massachusetts
Road Signs of Massachusetts
Massachusetts Roadtrips

Road jurisdiction maps:
 Interactive road jurisdiction map
 District 1 Road Jurisdiction PDF map (Berkshires and western Pioneer Valley)
 District 2 Road Jurisdiction PDF map (west-central)
 District 3 Road Jurisdiction PDF map (east-central)
 District 4 Road Jurisdiction PDF map (Boston metro and northeastern )
 District 5 Road Jurisdiction PDF map (Cape Cod and southeastern)

 
Highways